Morteza Poursamadi (born 1952 in Iran) is an Iranian cinematographer.

References

External links
 

Iranian cinematographers
1952 births
Living people
Iranian photographers